Talk Straight: The World of Rural Queers, originally titled Ich kenn keinen! - Allein unter Heteros, is a 2003 German documentary and semi-biographical film written and directed by Jochen Hick.  The film is set in Swabia, Germany, and follows the lives of four gay men, Hartmut, Richard, Stefan and Uwe.

Plot
The film explores the men's experiences and includes interviews with locals about how they feel about homosexuality.

Context
At the time that the film was written, homophobia had begun to substantially diminish in cities and metropolitan areas. Many German public figures at the time were beginning to openly identify as homosexual, and homosexuality was becoming generally more accepted in Germany. Gay men who lived in rural areas, by contrast, were more likely to face discrimination. Homophobic slurs remained in common use in rural areas, a fact which the film highlighted for many viewers. Hick succeeded in providing what would later become a historically significant insight into the suffering of gay men living in rural Germany.

Reception
Dennis Harvey of Variety wrote, "Funny, poignant and charming docu belies English title’s implied narrow focus to deliver a much looser appreciation of some quirky, semi-isolated gay men, the still largely homo-oblivious rural world they live in, various social networks/personal escape valves and life in general".

The film won the Teddy Award in 2003 for Best Documentary at the Berlin International Film Festival.

References

External links
 German Films

2003 documentary films
2003 LGBT-related films
2003 films
German documentary films
2000s German films